The San Carlos War Dog Training Center also called the Western Remount Area Reception and Training Center was located at San Carlos, California. Then was built at the old H & H Ranch. The US Army opened the 177 acre center on October 15, 1942. The center was used to train US Army dogs. The US Army ended the land lease on November 1, 1944. The land was built in to family homes in the 1950s.

San Carlos War Dog Training Center was one of five US Army dog training centers. The center was operated by the US Army Quartermaster Corps. Trained dogs were an important part of the World War II efforts. German Shepherds, Belgian Sheep dogs, Doberman Pinschers, farm Collies and Giant Schnauzers were trained at the center. At the center dogs were trained to be guards, scouts, messengers, mine detectors, sled and pack dogs. The training took 8 to 11 weeks, the dogs and the trainers were housed at the center.  Training was at first basic dog training, then advanced to dog being at easy with gunfire, riding in military vehicles and wearing gas masks. At is peak there were 550 troops, 15 civilian contractors  and up to 1,200 dogs at the center. By the end of the war 4,500 dogs and 2,500 men were trained at the center.

See also
Dogs in warfare
 Ancient warfare
 Animals in War Memorial, London
 Dickin Medal, UK honour awarded to animals "for gallantry" 
 Dogs of Roman Britain
 Examples of dogs that gained notability in war
 List of Labrador Retrievers
 List of individual dogs
 National War Dog Cemetery, Guam
 Police dog

References

External links

Webcast Presentation by Marine Corps Sergeant Mike Dowling about Sergeant Rex his memoir about his deployment to Iraq in 2004 along with military working dog Rex

Dogs in warfare